Małgorzata Jankowska née Grzelak is a Polish para table tennis player who competes at international table tennis competitions. She is a six-time European champion, five-time World medalist and three-time Paralympic medalist.

References

Living people
Sportspeople from Warsaw
Paralympic table tennis players of Poland
Table tennis players at the 2000 Summer Paralympics
Table tennis players at the 2004 Summer Paralympics
Table tennis players at the 2008 Summer Paralympics
Table tennis players at the 2012 Summer Paralympics
Medalists at the 2004 Summer Paralympics
Medalists at the 2008 Summer Paralympics
Medalists at the 2012 Summer Paralympics
Year of birth missing (living people)
Polish female table tennis players